Umar Rashad Ibn Abdullah-Johnson (born Jermaine Shoemake; August 21, 1974) is an American motivational speaker,Ali Swenson, Clip of Fox host is altered to add motivational speaker, Associated Press (August 30, 2022). psychologist, activist, and social media personality  who focuses on Pan-Africanism.

Early life and education 
His stepmother, Bernice Elizabeth Dockins Abdullah-Johnson, was a preschool teacher and his father had his name changed. 

Johnson attended the Duckery and Meade Elementary Schools in his native North Philadelphia community. Afterwards, he attended the former Beeber Junior High School where he was enrolled in an academically gifted program called Start Now. After graduating from Beeber in 1988, Johnson's father had him enrolled at the Scotland School for Veterans' Children and graduated in June 1992. Later that year Johnson enrolled in Millersville University of Pennsylvania where he graduated in 1997 with two Bachelors of Arts and Science degrees in psychology and political science. In 2012, he graduated from the Philadelphia College of Osteopathic Medicine as a Doctor of Psychology.

Career

Book and documentary appearance
In 2011, he was featured on The Untold History of People of Aboriginal, Moor, and African Descent, directed by Tariq Nasheed. In 2013, Johnson published Psycho-Academic Holocaust: The Special Education & ADHD Wars Against Black Boys, a book in which he contended that ADHD was increasingly misdiagnosed in the Black community and that the education system used ADHD to stigmatize black children. In a 2017 video clip, Johnson asserted that "ADHD does not exist. Neither does the learning disability."

School project
In June 2014, Johnson said he would raise $5 million to buy the former campus of Saint Paul's College in Lawrenceville, Virginia, which had closed down in 2013 due to financial struggles, and rename it to Frederick Douglass Marcus Garvey Academy, which he said would be a boarding school for Black boys. He claimed to have sufficient funds to buy the Saint Paul's site in 2014, but did not do so. In 2015, Johnson claimed that he would open the school the following year.

Charing Ball, writing in the online magazine MadameNoire, discouraged donations for the project, citing Johnson's  "homophobic and misogynistic" commentary in YouTube videos. In 2015, he opened a GoFundMe to raise money to "acquire and rehabilitate" either the former Saint Paul's or at Chamberlain-Hunt Academy in Port Gibson, Mississippi. In 2017, The Root criticized Johnson for failing to providing financial documentation demonstrating whether he actually used any of the funds for the school. Although Johnson claimed to have applied for 501(c)(3) tax-exempt nonprofit status in 2015, there was no record of an application with the IRS as of 2017.  In 2019, a Root commentator criticized Johnson for never providing a business plan, obtaining a license, publishing receipts, or taking other steps toward construction of the school, despite Johnson's claim in 2017 Johnson to have raised $400,000 or $700,000 for the school. In April 2021, Johnson stated that the school had completed construction but was not ready for classes.

Social media commentary, activism, and controversies
As a social media figure, Johnson amassed a following of 789,000 on Instagram and more than 163,000 on Twitter as of 2021. His commentary is pan-Africanist (which Johnson renders as "Pan-Afrikanist"), and he has called for Black Americans to identify with the African people globally rather than with individual religions, nationalities, professions, and fraternal organizations. He referred to himself on his website as the "prince of Pan-Africanism."Jeremy M. Lazarus, VSU shuts down appearance by controversial psychologist, Richmond Free Press (November 18, 2016).

Johnson has repeatedly claimed to have a familial connection with Frederick Douglass, often claiming to be a "direct descendant" of the 19th-century abolitionist and civil rights leader. The Douglass family released a statement saying that "We can tell you with 100% certainty that he [Johnson] is not a descendant of Frederick Douglass."

In December 2017, Johnson was ordered to attend a hearing before the Pennsylvania State Board of Psychology the following month. He faced charges of engaging in the practice of psychology without a license. Johnson denied that he had claimed to be a practicing licensed psychologist, and the Board did not strip him of a license.

In social media postings, Johnson has criticized interracial marriage, opposed same-sex marriage, and promoted various conspiracy theories. In January 2020, after the death of Kobe Bryant, Johnson falsely suggested that the helicopter was sabotaged as part of an assassination attempt ordered by the National Basketball Association and the pharmaceutical industry. In May 2021, Johnson criticized Kevin Samuels saying that he was "slandering and criticizing Black women who don’t emulate Eurocentric standards of beauty and success." In September 2021, he hosted an Instagram Live where he married two women.

In speech and social media posts, Johnson has promoted misinformation, including a viral Instagram post falsely claiming that Bill Gates sought for "at least 3 billion people" to die as part of a  population control scheme.Daniel Funke, Bill Gates didn't say '3 billion people need to die' to reverse climate change, Politifact (January 27, 2021). Johnson has also baselessly accused the Population Council and Planned Parenthood of "using homosexuality as a population control strategy in the black community." In contrast to mainstream psychology, he has referred to homosexuality as a mental disorder and claimed to be able to "treat" it. In a 2021 speech at Lehigh University, Johnson criticized former President Barack Obama, claiming that his administration "gave my civil rights over to the LGBTQ, ... the feminist movement, ... the Mexicans." In various speeches, Johnson also criticized President Joe Biden, contending that he had not done enough to protect Black people from police violence.

Many people have criticized Johnson, including commentators in the magazines The Root  (whose commentators have mocked Johnson as a "hotep") and TheGrio. South African commentator Khanya Mtshali, writing in a 2022 op-ed in the South African newspaper Mail & Guardian, likened Johnson to Louis Farrakhan and said that both men "trafficked in a goofy performance of pan-Africanism." Anwar Curtis, an opinion contributor to PennLive, defended Johnson, describing him in a 2017 op-ed as a "noted conservative and Afro-centric thinker" and "dedicated ... vessel for his people." 

In April 2017, Johnson founded the National Independent Black Parent Association in Leimert Park, Los Angeles.

References 

Living people
1974 births
American pan-Africanists
21st-century American psychologists
African-American psychologists
American child psychologists
American motivational speakers
American psychology writers
American male non-fiction writers
Writers from Philadelphia
Millersville University of Pennsylvania alumni
American nonprofit businesspeople
American conspiracy theorists
Pseudoscientific psychologists